Salamander Energy was a British-based oil and gas exploration and production business. Its activities were focused on South East Asia. It was headquartered in London and was listed on the London Stock Exchange until March 2015 when it was acquired by Ophir Energy. Following the completion of the acquisition, Salamander Energy was merged with its parent.

History
The company was founded by James Menzies, Nick Cooper and Andrew Cochran in 2005. It was first listed on the London Stock Exchange in 2006. In 2008, the company acquired GFI Oil & Gas Corporation.

On March 2, 2015 Salamander Energy announced that its $492 million purchase by Ophir Energy has been finalized.

Operations
The group was organised by country:
 Indonesia
 Thailand
 Laos
 Vietnam

References

External links
 

Oil and gas companies of the United Kingdom
Defunct companies based in London
Energy companies established in 2005
Non-renewable resource companies established in 2005